Titovo is a rural locality (a village) in Saminskoye Rural Settlement, Vytegorsky District, Vologda Oblast, Russia. The population was 33 as of 2002.

Geography 
Titovo is located 43 km north of Vytegra (the district's administrative centre) by road. Kryukovskaya is the nearest rural locality.

References 

Rural localities in Vytegorsky District